John Brown Steven (10 May 1935 – 6 April 2020), known as Jock Steven, was a Scottish rugby union player. He was the 107th President of the Scottish Rugby Union.

Rugby Union career

Amateur career

Steven was educated at Madras College and played rugby union for the school team. His family farmed at Dunino on the East Neuk of Fife.

On leaving school, he played for Madras College FP and captained the side in 1958-59 season and 1961-62 season.

Provincial career

Steven represented the combined North of Scotland District side in their 1964 match against New Zealand.

International career

Steven's closest time to being capped for Scotland was when he was an unused travelling reserve for the international side in a Five Nations match. He was not used.

He did play for the Barbarians in their 1962 tour of Wales.

Coaching career

He coached Madras College FP and the combined North of Scotland District side. He later coached the Scotland U18 team.

Administrative career

Steven was the Madras College FP president from 1970 to 1975.

He joined the SRU as Midlands District representative in 1976.

He was tour manager of the Scotland Development XV in their 1988 tour of Zimbabwe.

Steven became the 107th President of the Scottish Rugby Union. He served the standard one year from 1993 to 1994.

Family

Steven had 3 brothers:- Bill, Alan and Robert. In one memorable game in 1957 all 4 brothers, including Jock, made the Madras College FP first XV.

References

1935 births
2020 deaths
Scottish rugby union players
Presidents of the Scottish Rugby Union
Madras College FP players
Barbarian F.C. players
North of Scotland (combined side) players
Rugby union players from Fife
Rugby union flankers